Tinderry is a locality in the Snowy Monaro Region, New South Wales, Australia. It lies to the east of Michelago and South West of Captains Flat. The western part of the locality lies on the Tinderry Range, which includes Tinderry Peak and Tinderry Twin Peak. A large part of the mountainous terrain forms Tinderry Nature Reserve. Further east the terrain is more open and includes grazing country and the small settlement of Little Tinderry. A public school was located at Little Tinderry from 1899 to 1913, generally described as "half-time", but "provisional" in 1900 and early 1901.

References

Snowy Monaro Regional Council
Localities in New South Wales
Southern Tablelands